Colobodectes is an extinct genus of dicynodont therapsid from the Tapinocephalus Assemblage Zone in the Abrahamskraal Formation (Beaufort Group), South Africa.

See also 
 List of therapsids

References

External links 
 The main groups of non-mammalian synapsids at Mikko's Phylogeny Archive

Dicynodonts
Permian synapsids of Africa
Fossils of South Africa
Fossil taxa described in 2003
Anomodont genera